Troy Lesesne (born October 27, 1983) is an American soccer coach.

College

Born in West Columbia, South Carolina, Lesesne played four years of college soccer at the College of Charleston, helping them to 47 wins and a 2004 National Collegiate Athletic Association 2nd Round Tournament appearance after winning the Southern Conference Championship.  He graduated from the Department of Communication with a Bachelor of Arts in 2004 and a Masters of Arts in Communication in 2010. He was named a United Soccer Coaches NSCAA Division I All American following his senior season.

Professional

In August 2005, Lesesne signed with the Charleston Battery where he made 38 appearances in two seasons and helped the team progress to the United Soccer League Championship semifinals in 2006.

Management

From 2005–2014 Lesesne spent ten years as an Assistant Coach for the College of Charleston where he helped the program compile an 82–76–14 record, along with a Southern Conference regular-season championship and a second-round National Collegiate Athletic Association Tournament appearance in 2010. During his tenure, he was named one of the top-20 assistant coaches in the nation by CollegeSoccerNews.com  in 2011 and 2013 and was also selected to the inaugural United Soccer Coaches NCAA “Top 30 Under 30” coaches program in 2013. 

In 2014, Lesesne ascended from the college game to the professional coaching ranks spending the season as assistant coach and liaison with the Charleston Battery as part of their Major League Soccer and United Soccer League affiliation, serving as technical staff working with players on loan from the Vancouver Whitecaps. The Battery finished the 2014 campaign fifth in the regular-season standings, earning the club a spot in the playoffs.

In 2015, Lesesne was named the first assistant for the new expansion United Soccer League Championship team, Charlotte Independence, where he spent four years coaching under Mike Jeffries. He assisted in the team qualifying for back-to-back playoffs in 2016 and 2017, along with advancing to round 16 in the Lamar Hunt U.S. Open Cup in the club's inaugural season, which was the furthest for any lower league team.

On 13 August 2018, Lesesne was announced as the first Head Coach and Technical Director of the new United Soccer League Championship expansion club, New Mexico United.

During his tenure with New Mexico United, the club posted a 34W-29D-25L record with two playoff appearances in 2019 and 2020. In 2019, New Mexico United advanced to the Quarterfinals of the Lamar Hunt US Open Cup. In 2020 the club secured its first playoff win and Lesesne was named USL Co-Coach of the Year. Lesesne also played an integral role in helping New Mexico United establish the Diversity Fellowship Program and a fully-funded youth academy, which produced its first-ever homegrown signing in Cristian Nava in 2021.

On January 25. 2022, Lesesne joined New York Red Bulls as assistant coach. 

Lesesne holds his United States Soccer Federation Pro Coaching License.

References

Living people
American soccer coaches
New Mexico United coaches
1983 births
People from West Columbia, South Carolina
Soccer players from South Carolina
Sportspeople from Columbia, South Carolina
College of Charleston Cougars men's soccer players
College of Charleston Cougars men's soccer coaches
Charleston Battery players
Charleston Battery coaches
Charlotte Independence coaches
New York Red Bulls non-playing staff
Association football midfielders
American soccer players